Croix-en-Ternois is a commune in the Pas-de-Calais department in the Hauts-de-France region of France.

Geography

Motorcycle race track
Croix-en-Ternois has a small motorcycle race track named Circuit de Croix-en-Ternois.

Population

Places of interest
 The church of St.Martin, dating from the nineteenth century
 Remains of a 15th-century castle.
 The eighteenth-century château.

See also
Communes of the Pas-de-Calais department

References

External links

 Croix-en-Ternois circuit

Communes of Pas-de-Calais